The 2004 FC Rubin Kazan season was the club's 2nd season in the Russian Premier League, the highest tier of association football in Russia. They finished the season in tenth position, were knocked out of the UEFA Cup in the Second qualifying round by Rapid Wien and reached the Last 16 of the 2003–04 Russian Cup and Last 32 of the 2004–05 Russian Cup.

Season review

Squad

On loan

Left club during season

Transfers

In

Out

Loans out

Released

Competitions

Premier League

Results by round

Results

League table

Russian Cup

2003-04

2004-05

UEFA Cup

Squad statistics

Appearances and goals

|-
|colspan="14"|Players away from the club on loan:

|-
|colspan="14"|Players who appeared for Rubin Kazan but left during the season:

|}

Goal scorers

Disciplinary record

References

FC Rubin Kazan seasons
Rubin Kazan